Arce (Basque: Artzi) is a town located in the province of Navarre, in the autonomous community of Navarre, northern Spain.

References

External links
 ARCE - ARTZI in the Bernardo Estornés Lasa - Auñamendi Encyclopedia (Euskomedia Fundazioa) 

Municipalities in Navarre